
Gmina Bytów is an urban-rural gmina (administrative district) in Bytów County, Pomeranian Voivodeship, in northern Poland.

The gmina contains part of the protected area called Słupia Valley Landscape Park.

Villages
Apart from the town of Bytów, Gmina Bytów contains the villages and settlements of Brynki Rekowskie, Chomice, Dąbie, Dąbki, Gostkowo, Grzmiąca, Leśno, Mądrzechowo, Mała Wieś, Międzygórze, Mokrzyn, Nieczulice, Niezabyszewo, Płotówko, Płotowo, Półczynek, Pomysk Mały, Pomysk Wielki, Pomyski Młyn, Przyborzyce, Pustkowie Rekowskie, Pyszno, Rekowo, Rzepnica, Sarniak, Sierżenko, Sierzno, Świątkowo, Świerkówko, Szarzyn, Udorpie, Ząbinowice and Zbysław.

Neighbouring gminas
Gmina Bytów is bordered by the gminas of Borzytuchom, Czarna Dąbrówka, Lipnica, Parchowo, Studzienice and Tuchomie.

References
Polish official population figures 2006

Bytow
Bytów County